Matt Nathanson: Live at Google is a live recording of Matt Nathanson's performance at the Google Campus in early July 2011 to promote Google's new service, Music Beta by Google (subsequently rebranded as Google Play).

Track listing

Recording and production

At Google 
During the Summer of 2011, Music Beta by Google was hosting a series of concerts at the Googleplex. The second in the series of concerts was opened by jazz artist Meklit Hadero and headlined by Matt Nathanson.

Throughout the show Nathanson made jabs at both audience members and even Facebook. One notable instance was while Nathanson was preparing the audience for a sing-a-long, he called attention to an audience member on his laptop when he said, "You're in the front, you're on your computer, but I know what you're doing is looking up the lyrics. You don't have to look up the lyrics, because this is totally easy. 'Hee,' 'hee,' 'who.' It's - and I feel it, I felt you wanting to sing."

References

2011 live albums
Matt Nathanson albums
Vanguard Records live albums
Google